The 2007 Katsina State gubernatorial election occurred on 14 April 2007. PDP candidate Ibrahim Shema won the election, defeating ANPP Abu Ibrahim and other candidates.

Results
Ibrahim Shema from the PDP won the election. He defeated Abu Ibrahim of the ANPP and others.

The total number of registered voters in the state was 2,589,047.

Ibrahim Shema, (PDP)- 1,185,489
Abu Ibrahim, ANPP- 218,302
Usman Bugaje, ACN- 54,449
Sani Abu- 3,442

References 

Katsina State gubernatorial election
Katsina State gubernatorial election
2007